The Jersey Journal is a daily newspaper, published from Monday through Saturday, covering news and events throughout Hudson County, New Jersey. The Journal is a sister paper to The Star-Ledger of Newark, The Times of Trenton and the Staten Island Advance, all of which are owned by Advance Publications, which bought the paper in 1945.

History

Founded by Civil War veterans William Dunning and Z. K. Pangborn, the Jersey Journal was originally known as the Evening Journal and was first published on May 2, 1867. The newspaper's first offices were located at 13 Exchange Place in Jersey City with a reported initial capitalization of $119.

The newspaper built a new office building on 37 Montgomery Street in 1874.

Editor Joseph A. Dear changed the Evening Journal to its current name in 1909.

The paper relocated again, in 1911, to a building at the northeast corner of Bergen and Sip Avenues. This building was demolished in 1923 to make room for Journal Square, which took its name from the newspaper. The Journal made its home at 30 Journal Square for the next 90 years. Its weekly Spanish-language publication, El Nuevo Hudson, ceased publication after the February 26, 2009, edition.

In December 2012, it was announced that the newspaper would sell the building and relocate to another location in Hudson County. In August 2013, the paper announced it would move to Secaucus, which it did in January 2014. It maintains offices at 30 Montgomery Street in Jersey City.

Newspapers in Education Program
The Jersey Journals Newspapers in Education Program, supported with an additional sponsorship, comprises three annual events and awards: the Hudson County Science Fair, the Hudson County Spelling Bee, and the Everyday Heroes Awards.

Timeline
1867-1909: The newspaper is published as The Evening Journal.
1871: Its building is on 142 Greene Street.
1874: Headquarters move to 37 Montgomery Street. 
1891: The Journal demolishes the historic Buck's Hotel to expand the back of its building.
1909: The name is changed to The Jersey Journal.
1911: The headquarters are moved to Journal Square.
1951: The paper merges with The Jersey Observer.
2014: The paper's offices move from Jersey City to Secaucus.

References

External links
Official website
The Jersey Journal at the Library of Congress
History of the Journal

Newspapers published in New Jersey
Mass media in Hudson County, New Jersey
Newspapers established in 1867
Advance Publications
1867 establishments in New Jersey